Pingrup is a small town in the Great Southern region of Western Australia.

The name of the town is Indigenous Australian in origin and was the name of a lake that is close to the townsite. The meaning of Pingrup is most likely taken from A.A. Hassell of Jerramungup (1894) recording of Pingrup (bingerup) meaning place where digging. The Noongar Dictionary gives the meaning for Pingrup as "place where they are digging or have been digging". The name first appeared on charts of the area in 1873.

The townsite came into being as a terminus of the Nyabing railway when it was extended into the area in 1923. The townsite was gazetted in 1924.

The surrounding areas produce wheat and other cereal crops. The town is a receival site for Cooperative Bulk Handling.

References 

Great Southern (Western Australia)
Grain receival points of Western Australia